Pay gap may refer to:

Gender pay gap
Gender pay gap in the United States
Gender pay gap in Australia
Gender pay gap in Russia
Gender pay gap in India
Gender pay gap in New Zealand
Gender pay gap in the United States tech industry
Racial pay gap in the United States

See also
Economic discrimination
Economic inequality
Equal pay for equal work
Gay wage gap
Gender inequality in Mexico
Gender inequality in China
Gender inequality in India
Income inequality metrics
Wage theft
Productivity-pay gap